Loricariichthys chanjoo, one of a number of Loricariichthys species commmonly known as Shitari, is a species of catfish in the family Loricariidae. It is endemic to Peru, where it occurs in the Ucayali River basin, with its type locality being listed as Contamana. The species reaches  in length and is believed to be a facultative air-breather.

References 

Loricariini
Fish described in 1940
Endemic fauna of Peru